Kammapalli is a village and Panchayat in Dakkili mandal in the Nellore district in the state of Andhra Pradesh in India.

References

Villages in Nellore district